Ni'Ja Whitson is an interdisciplinary artist, performer, writer and the founder/artistic director of The NWA Project. Whitson is gender non-conforming and use the pronouns they/them.

Career 

A Bessie-Award-winning gender nonconforming interdisciplinary artist, performer and writer, Ni’Ja Whitson has been referred to as "majestic" and "magnetic" by The New York Times, and is recognized by Brooklyn Magazine as being one of the 100 culture influencers. Recent awards include a Hedgebrook Residency, LMCC Process Space Residency, Bogliasco Fellowship, Brooklyn Arts Exchange Artist Residency, two-time Creative Capital "On Our Radar" award including being an inaugural recipient, among many other recognitions across disciplines.

Works 

 A Meditation on Tongues (2017)
 Quasar (2015)
 Summons and Arrival (2015)
 Tribute to Malachi Maghostut Favors (2015)
 When Water Dries the Mouth (2015)

References 

African-American women artists
American artists
American choreographers